Seringapatam or Srirangapatna is a town in Mandya district of the Indian state of Karnataka.

Seringapatam may also refer to:
 Siege of Seringapatam (1799), last stand of Mysore sultan Tipu Sultan against the British
 Seringapatam (1799 ship)
 Seringapatam-class frigate
 Seringapatam medal, British East India Company medal for the 1799 battle

See also
 List of ships named Seringapatam